Gary is a surname. Notable people with the surname include:
Arthur Gary (1914–2005), American radio and television announcer
Bruce Gary (1951–2006), American drummer
Carlton Gary (1950–2018), American serial killer and rapist
Charlos Gary (born 1968), American cartoonist and comic strip author
Cleveland Gary (born 1966), American football player
Dairese Gary (born 1988), American basketball player
Donald A. Gary (1901–1977), American U.S. Naval officer, recipient of the Medal of Honor
Elbert Henry Gary (1846–1927), American lawyer, county judge and corporate officer
Frank B. Gary (1860–1922), American politician
Greg Gary (basketball), American college basketball coach
Greg Gary (Canadian football) (born 1958), former Canadian gridiron football linebacker and current coach
Guilian Gary (born 1980), American football player and coach
Henry Gary, English governor of Bombay, 1667–1668
James Albert Gary (1833–1920), American politician
Jim Gary (1939–2006), American sculptor
Joe Gary (born 1959), American football player
John Gary (1932—1998), American singer
John G. Gary (born 1943), American politician
Joseph Gary (1821–1906), American judge in anarchist trial
Justin Gary, American digital card game champion
J. Vaughan Gary (1892–1973), American politician
Keith Gary (born 1959), American football player
Linda Gary (1944–1995), American voice actor and voice-over artist
Lorraine Gary (born 1937), American actress
Marianne Gary-Schaffhauser (1903–1992), Austrian composer
Martin Witherspoon Gary (1831–1881), American brigadier general in the Confederate States Army
Mike Gary (1900–1969), American athlete and coach
Nancy E. Gary (1937–2006), American dean of a U.S. medical school
Olandis Gary (born 1975), American football player
Rashan Gary (born 1997), American football player
Raymond D. Gary (1908–1993), American politician, Oklahoma
Romain Gary (1914–1980), French diplomat, novelist, film director and World War II aviator
Russell Gary (1959–2019), American football player
Sam Gary (1917–1986), American blues, spiritual and folk singer
Willie Gary (American football) (born 1978), American football player